Nemo is a given name, nickname and surname. It is Latin for "nobody", and may refer to the Outis alias that Odysseus used to trick Polyphemus in The Odyssey.

It can also be used as a nickname for the given name Geronimo.

People
 Willard Nemo Gaines (1897–1979), American Major League Baseball player and naval captain
 Harry Loran Nemo Leibold (1892–1977), American Major League Baseball player, named after the comic strip character Little Nemo
 Antti Niemi (ice hockey) (born 1983), Finnish former National Hockey League goaltender nicknamed "Nemo"
 Qiyu Zhou (born 2000), Chinese-born Canadian chess player and streamer also known as Nemo Zhou
 Gina Nemo (born 1965), American actress
 Henry Nemo (1909–1999), American musician, songwriter and actor
 Louis-Paul Némo, birth name of Roparz Hemon (1900–1978), Breton author and scholar
 Nemo Ramjet, pen name of artist and author C. M. Kosemen

Fictional characters
 Captain Nemo, in Jules Verne's novels Twenty Thousand Leagues Under the Sea and Mysterious Island (1870), and adaptations thereof
 Little Nemo, protagonist of the comic strip Little Nemo in Slumberland by Winsor McCay (1905)
 Nemo, a clownfish, in the film Finding Nemo (2003) and its sequel Finding Dory (2016)
 Nemo, a minor character in the Charles Dickens novel Bleak House (1852)
 Nemo Nobody, the title character of the film Mr. Nobody (2009)
 Quentin Nemo, a warlock from the novel Orphans of Chaos (2005)
 Judge Nemo, main villain of the video game Disgaea 4
 Nicolas Monroe "Nemo" Makalintal, a minor character in the 2018 Philippine romantic-comedy series The One That Got Away
 NEMO, the player character of the video game Ace Combat 3: Electrosphere

Animals
Nemo (dog), French President Macron's dog

Lists of people by nickname